The 1953 World Greco-Roman Wrestling Championship were held in Naples, Italy.

Medal table

Team ranking

Medal summary

Men's Greco-Roman

External links
FILA Database

World Wrestling Championships
W
1953 in sport wrestling
1953 in Italian sport